Thomas C. McCreery (1816–1890) was a U.S. Senator from Kentucky from 1868 to 1871. Senator McCreery may also refer to:

John W. McCreery (1845–1917), West Virginia State Senate
William McCreery (Maryland politician) (1750–1814), Maryland State Senate

See also
James B. McCreary (1838–1918), U.S. senator from Kentucky from 1903 to 1909